Rohit Pujari is the representative of Rairakhol Vidhan Sabha Constituency. He is a politician from Odisha, India. He is a member of the Biju Janata Dal political party. He is currently the deputy chief whip, Odisha Government. He also served as Deputy Chief whip, Odisha Government from 2014 to 2019. Pujari also served as chairman, Odisha Lift Irrigation Corporation from 2009 to 2014. Prior to joining BJD in 2009, he was the president of the Odisha Pradesh Youth Congress and AICC member.

References

Year of birth missing (living people)
Living people
Odisha MLAs 2019–2024
Biju Janata Dal politicians